Hampa or Hompa may refer to:

Places
 Hampa, East Azerbaijan
 Hampa, West Azerbaijan

Titles
 Hompa, in the traditional leadership of Namibia a king of a tribe or clan